Langlitinden is the highest mountain on the island of Andørja and is also the highest mountain on any Norwegian island (except Beerenberg, Jan Mayen). It is located on the northeastern part of the island in the municipality of Ibestad in Troms og Finnmark county, Norway, just to the south of the Mjøsund Bridge and just northwest of the shore of the Astafjorden.

References

Mountains of Troms og Finnmark
Ibestad